Aniba pedicellata is a species of plant in the family Lauraceae. It is endemic to Brazil.

References

Flora of Brazil
pedicellata
Critically endangered plants
Taxonomy articles created by Polbot